The women's 5000 metres event at the 2002 Commonwealth Games was held on 28 July.

Results

References
Official results
Results at BBC

5000
2002
2002 in women's athletics